Bellemerea elegans is a species of saxicolous (rock-dwelling) and crustose lichen in the family Lecideaceae. Found in Antarctica, it was formally described as a new species in 2009 by Norwegian lichenologist Dag Øvstedal. The type specimen was collected from the Admiralty Bay area of King George Island. Bellemerea elegans is only known from the type specimen. Its apothecia are more or less immersed in the thallus (aspicilioid), measuring up to 1.1 in diameter, with a dull brown disc. Ascospores number eight per ascus, and measure 12–14 by 5–7 μm. The lichen contains porphyrilic acid, a lichen product.

References

Lecideales
Lichen species
Lichens described in 2009
Lichens of Antarctica